INECOBANK is one of the leading South Caucasus banks, headquartered in Yerevan, Armenia. The bank offers a full range of banking services, including digital banking services to individuals, SME and corporate clients. The bank was founded on February 7, 1996 licensed by CBA General banking license No. 85).

Starting from 1998, the bank has been cooperating with over 30 international financial organizations, and has established nostro-correspondent relations with a number of leading international banks.

The bank has two major shareholders - Avetis Baloyan (30% of shares) and Karen Safaryan (25.92% of shares). In 2015, European Bank of Reconstruction and Development  became a shareholder of Inecobank, acquiring 22.7% of shares and in 2018 agRIF cooperatief  became a shareholder acquiring 10% of shares from IFC and DEG in a private transaction.

In October 2019, Inecobank appointed Aren Naltakyan as the company Chief Executive Officer.

History 
The history of Inecobank dates back to 1996, when two Armenian businessmen Avetis Baloyan and Karen Safaryan along with other Armenian partners founded the bank․ The total capital of the bank as of FY 2018 is more than USD 100mln.

The bank has delivered a number of industry leading digital banking solutions, some which are presented below:

 In 2019 the bank introduced new feature - "Transfer to Card",  which enables InecoOnline and InecoMobile users to make account-to-card and card-to-card transfers to the cards issued by the banks partnering ArCa system.
In 2018 the bank was the first in the banking system to launch InecoPay payment system enabling to make payments from smartphones.
 In 2017, the bank was the first to introduce a fully automated consumer lending solution through its mobile and online applications. As a result the loans are provided 24 hours a day, 7 days a week.
 In 2014 the bank launched InecoMobile, its Mobile banking application. Today according to the official information provided by the bank, the application is one of the leading financial applications in the country, with over 150 000 active users.
 In 2012, with the introduction of InecoOnline, the bank was one of the first to provide 24/7 banking services to its customers.
 In 2009, the bank digitized and fully automated the “Point of Sale Loan” product, reducing the loan generation from 3–4 days to a few minutes.

See also

Armenian dram
List of banks in Armenia
Economy of Armenia

References

Banks of Armenia
Armenian companies established in 1996
Banks established in 1996